Yusuf Abu Rayya (1955 – 12 January 2009) was an Egyptian author.

Early life
He was born in 1955 in Hihya in the Sharqiya Governorate, and studied journalism at Cairo University. His first published book was a collection of short stories in 1985, followed by his first novel in 1989. He wrote over a dozen books including novels, children's books and short story collections. His best known work is Wedding Night, published in 2002. This novel won the Naguib Mahfouz Medal, and an English translation by R Neil Hewison was published by the AUC Press in 2006.

Career
Abu Rayya served on the governing board of the Egyptian branch of PEN International. He lent vocal support to the Syrian writer Haidar Haidar, who was the subject of a fatwa by clerics at Al-Azhar University in 2000. Abu Rayya died of liver cancer in January 2009.

References

Egyptian novelists
Egyptian male short story writers
Egyptian short story writers
1955 births
2009 deaths
People from Sharqia Governorate
Cairo University alumni
Recipients of the Naguib Mahfouz Medal for Literature
Deaths from liver cancer
Deaths from cancer in Egypt
20th-century novelists
20th-century short story writers
20th-century male writers